Cruise/Wagner Productions, also abbreviated as C/W Productions, was an American independent film production company. It was founded by actor Tom Cruise and his agent Paula Wagner in July 1992. Wagner had been representing Cruise for eleven years before the formation of C/W Productions. The company has grossed more than $2.9 billion in box office proceeds since its inception.

Cruise/Wagner Productions was formed to give Cruise more creative freedom over his film projects and to give him the opportunity to produce and direct motion pictures. In October 1992, Cruise/Wagner Productions signed an exclusive three-year multi-picture financing and distribution deal with Paramount Pictures. The deal was renewed and expanded several times over the next fourteen years. In August 2006 Sumner Redstone, chairman of Viacom (parent company of Paramount Pictures) terminated that relationship citing Cruise's comments in the media about psychiatry, anti-depressants and Brooke Shields' handling of postpartum depression, and his taking up Scientology. However, the termination may have been more about money than anything else. Within a week, Daniel Snyder, owner of the Washington Redskins and two hedge funds, secured financial backing to buy the company.

In November 2006, Metro-Goldwyn-Mayer came to Cruise/Wagner with a deal that gave them a percentage of the ownership in United Artists in an effort to revive the floundering production company. This deal fell apart when Wagner left the studio in August 2008.

Productions

Feature films

References

External links
 United Artists Official Website

1992 establishments in California
2008 disestablishments in California
American companies established in 1992
American companies disestablished in 2008
American independent film studios
Companies based in Los Angeles
 
Defunct companies based in Greater Los Angeles
Defunct film and television production companies of the United States
Entertainment companies based in California
Mass media companies established in 1992
Mass media companies disestablished in 2008
Privately held companies based in California
Tom Cruise